Madhu Vasudevan is an Indian author, poet, lyricist and music critic who writes predominantly in Malayalam, English and Hindi. He was honored in the 45th Kerala State Film Awards, 64th Filmfare Awards South and 61st Filmfare Awards South for Best Lyricist. His songs from the movie Jalam were shortlisted for Oscar Award 2016 for original song category.

Career

His entry into song writing began from his close association with Padmabhushan Mohanlal, one of India's most acclaimed actors. He joined script writer S Sureshbabu and Director M. Padmakumar, in 2012.

Lyrics

Bibliography
 Samskritiyude Vyakaranam- 2001, published by Current Books, Kottayam
 Sangeethaswadanam- 2002, published by Kerala State Literacy Mission
 Sangeetharthamu – 2007, Paperback, D C Books, Kottayam 
 Sangeetharthamu – 2018, republished by Sahithya Pravarthaka Co-Operative Society, Kottayam 
 MDR – A unique octave in Music- , DC Books, Kottayam – A study on Padmabhushan M. D. Ramanathan, an eminent Carnatic music vocalist with Illustrations by Artist Nampoothiri
 M.D. Ramanathan, Meaningful Pauses – 2009, 231 pages, D.C. Books

Awards
 64th Filmfare Awards South for the best lyricist, 2017
 61st Filmfare Awards South, 2014 for the best lyricist for the song Ottaykku Paadunna from the film Nadan
 3rd South Indian International Movie Awards (3rd SIIMA Awards) 2014, for best lyricist for the song "Ottakku Padunna" from Nadan
 45th Kerala State Film Awards for best lyricist for the song "Ottakku Padunna" from the film Nadan

References

External links
 
 

Living people
Malayalam-language lyricists
Filmfare Awards South winners
Kerala State Film Award winners
Malayalam-language writers
Year of birth missing (living people)